The Bharat New Vehicle Safety Assessment Program, usually known as the Bharat NCAP, is a proposed New Car Assessment Program for India. Cars sold in the country will be assigned by star ratings based on their safety performance. It will be implemented in phases, according to the plans being drawn up by the National Automotive Testing and R&D Infrastructure Project.  It is the 10th NCAP in the world and is being set up by the government of India.

The program was expected to begin mid-2014, but postponed to start from 2017. (Because of delay in setting up labs and other facilities) Within two years of implementation, new cars sold in India will need to comply with voluntary star ratings based on crash safety performance tests. Critical safety features such as airbags, ABS, and seat belt reminders will become standard in cars sold in India resulting from rankings and mandatory crash testing. Offset front crash, side, and rear impact tests will be required by 2017. Cars will gradually have to meet more stringent norms such as pedestrian protection, whiplash injury and child restraint systems standards and requirements.

The number of deaths due to road accidents in India is around three to four times that of European countries like France, Germany and Spain. The Indian automotive safety standards have been criticised as being insufficient and ineffective. India has the world's sixth-largest car market, but is still the only country among the global top ten car markets without a testing program that measures the safety of vehicles. It is estimated that vehicles in India will cost 8–15% more resulting from compliance with these norms. However, harmonizing India's vehicle safety standards with global standards is expected to help automakers export locally produced cars globally.

It is proposed that this BNVSAP would start the official testing from October 2017 onwards. The car testing protocols is defined by ARAI as follows:
 Frontal offset testing (64 km/h proposed)
 Side impact testing
 Pedestrian protection testing 
 Rear impact testing
 Child dummy dynamic crash testing

Points would be awarded to the car based on the safety features in the car like ABS, seat belt reminders, child lock, and Electronic Stability Control.

India has seen more road deaths per year than any other nation since 2006, costing lives at the rate of 230,000 annually. Manufacturers and vehicle safety lobbyists support the retention of the inferior frontal crash test at 56 km/h (34.8 mph).

NHTSA is the standards followed by the US safety standards, carry out frontal crash tests at 64.3 km/h (40 mph). Under BNVCAP, similar to Euro NCAP, vehicles will be crash tested at 64 km/h for frontal impacts which is the average speed in India. 
 
Crash test facilities are being set up and are regularly updated on a site called NATRiP.

In 2022 Union Transport Minister Nitin Gadkari announced that cars in India will be tested by Bharat NCAP.

See also
 Automotive Industry Standards

References

New Car Assessment Programs
Automotive industry in India
Consumer organisations in India